Major General Daniel Marcus William Beak,  (27 Jan 1891 – 3 May 1967) was a British Army officer and an English recipient of the Victoria Cross, the highest award for gallantry in the face of the enemy that can be awarded to British and Commonwealth forces.

Early life
Beak was born in Southampton, Hampshire on 27 Jan 1891 and educated at Taunton's School.

First World War

1915–1917
Beak joined the Royal Naval Volunteer Reserve as a rating on 2 February 1915, but before seeing action was commissioned as a temporary sub-lieutenant in the Royal Naval Division in May 1915. He was posted to the Mediterranean Expeditionary Force, but it is not clear from his service record if he saw action in that theatre. He arrived in France in May 1916, and after being appointed adjutant of Drake Battalion on 2 March 1917, he ended up commanding his battalion as an acting commander between 19 March 1917 and 3 April 1917. He was promoted to temporary lieutenant commander on relinquishing command, and attached to headquarters.

He was awarded the Military Cross (MC) in January 1917, and a Bar to his MC on 18 July 1917.  The citations read:

He attended the Senior Officers' Course in Aldershot in late 1917 and on 31 December was promoted temporary commander, and appointed as commanding officer of the Howe Battalion.

1918
Beak remained in command of the Howe Battalion, then briefly commanded the Anson Battalion in the first week of March 1918, and then transferred back to the Drake Battalion on 13 March 1918. He was Mentioned in Despatches on 20 May, and awarded the Distinguished Service Order (DSO) on 26 July 1918, the citation read:

He was sick for four days with the flu in July 1918, and was granted a period of home leave in August, returning on 10 August. During the period 21/25 August and on 4 September 1918 at Logeast Wood, France, Commander Beak led his men and captured four enemy positions under heavy fire. Four days later, although dazed by a shell fragment, in the absence of the brigade commander, he reorganised the whole brigade under extremely heavy gun fire and led his men to their objective. When an attack was held up, accompanied by only one runner he succeeded in breaking up a nest of machine-guns, personally bringing in nine or ten prisoners. His initiative and the confidence with which he inspired all ranks, contributed very materially to the success of these operations. In recognition of his efforts, Beak was awarded the Victoria Cross. The full citation was published in a supplement to the London Gazette of 12 November 1918 (dated 15 November 1918):

He received a second Mention in Despatches on 20 December 1918. With the war now over he was granted several periods of home leave, returned home permanently in May 1919, and was demobilised in June.

Inter-war service
In 1921, he was granted a regular army commission with the Royal Scots Fusiliers as a captain. Beak was in Ireland with his regiment during the Irish War of Independence. In the situation, following the collapse of the British civilian administration, his duties included membership of the Courts of Enquiry in lieu of Inquests. In July 1921 he is documented as a member of the enquiry into the shooting of Richard and Abraham Pearson by the South Offaly No. 2 Brigade IRA.

He was given a brevet promotion to major in 1929, and substantive promotion in 1932, on transfer to the King's Regiment (Liverpool). He was promoted brevet lieutenant colonel in 1935. The substantive promotion followed in 1938, transferring again, this time to the South Lancashire Regiment.

Second World War
During the Second World War, Beak was initially the Commanding Officer of the 1st Battalion, South Lancashire Regiment which fought in the Battle of France. In June 1940 he was made commander of 12th Brigade, GOC Malta Command and 151st Infantry Brigade, part of the 50th (Northumbrian) Infantry Division, which he led during Operation Pugilist. General Sir Bernard Montgomery dismissed him from this post after that battle and he never held another command.

He was an acting brigadier by 2 August 1940 when his promotion to colonel was gazetted. A Mention in Despatches was gazetted on 20 December 1940, for services between March and June of that year. He was promoted temporary major general in January 1942. He retired from the army on 19 February 1945, retaining the honorary rank of major general.

His VC is on display in the Lord Ashcroft Gallery at the Imperial War Museum, London.

He is buried in an unmarked grave at Brookwood Cemetery in Surrey but in recognition of his close ties to Cheltenham, where he served as Acting Secretary of Cheltenham YMCA in 1913, they, together with This England magazine, erected a commemorative plaque by the main war memorial in the Promenade, which was dedicated by the Mayor of Cheltenham on 27 September 2006.

References

Bibliography

External links
Generals of World War II
Biography of Major-General Daniel Beak 

 

1891 births
1967 deaths
British World War I recipients of the Victoria Cross
Royal Navy personnel of World War I
British Army generals of World War II
Companions of the Distinguished Service Order
British military personnel of the Irish War of Independence
Royal Scots Fusiliers officers
King's Regiment (Liverpool) officers
South Lancashire Regiment officers
Burials at Brookwood Cemetery
Royal Navy recipients of the Victoria Cross
Recipients of the Military Cross
People from South Stoneham
People educated at Taunton School
Military personnel from Southampton
British Army major generals
63rd (Royal Naval) Division soldiers
Royal Navy officers